Titano the Super-Ape is a supervillain who appears in American comic books published by DC Comics, primarily as a foe of Superman. The character is a small chimpanzee named Toto who was sent into space for test flight, until an exposure of combined rays have made him grow to gigantic size and gave him Kryptonite-like powers. As a "Super-Ape", Titano rampaged through Metropolis several times in Superman and Superman's Pal Jimmy Olsen during the Silver Age, and also appeared in some "Tales of the Bizarro World" stories in Adventure Comics. After a poorly-received 1978 return fight, Titano was dropped from the canvas.

The character also appeared in the post-Crisis on Infinite Earths and New 52 continuities, with different origin stories.

Publication history
Titano first appeared in Superman #127 (February 1959) in a story called "Titano the Super-Ape!" He was created by writer Otto Binder, penciler Wayne Boring and inker Stan Kaye. The character was inspired by the 1933 film King Kong, one of the many famous science-fiction and horror films swiped by Superman editor Mort Weisinger during this period.

The character was well received, so Weisinger decided to bring him back for a second story in July 1960. In the first story, Boring drew the character with a chimpanzee head on a giant gorilla body; for the rematch, Boring drew a gorilla head instead, making the character look more like King Kong.

Titano made another brief appearance in a January 1961 Superman story ("Superman Meets Al Capone!", issue #142), where he served as an introductory plot device to get Superman lost in time. By August 1961, Titano became a novelty character, appearing in a Superman backup feature starring Krypto the Superdog ("Krypto Battles Titano", issue #147), and this trend continued over the next few years, as Titano appeared in occasional "Tales of the Bizarro World" backup stories in Adventure Comics, and made lightweight appearances in a few Superman's Pal Jimmy Olsen stories between 1962 and 1965. After a cameo in a Superman story in 1970, Titano disappeared from the canvas for a while.

In 1978, Martin Pasko brought Titano back for a two-part story with the Atomic Skull in Superman #323 and 324 — a story that Pasko looked back on with regret, as revealed in interview from 2007: "I thought — foolishly, in retrospect — that I might be able to treat a giant ape that shot kryptonite energy from its eyes with the same straight face I brought to Bizarro. I couldn't, and matters were not helped by the art. We kept forgetting that what you got when you called upon the hyper-realistic and earthbound Curt Swan to draw menacing giant monsters invariably looked cute and cuddly at best, and at worst, like something that reminded you of an old Toho movie and made you look for the zipper. I seem to recall that the mail suggested that Titano was one Weisingerism that was best relegated to obscurity".

Fictional character biography

Pre-Crisis
Originally named Toto, a common chimpanzee who was dubbed "one of the world's most intelligent chimps". Rocketed in his spaceship, he is bombarded by the combined radiation from two elements, which mutates him into a giant ape with an incredible physique and Kryptonite-based abilities. Renamed Titano by Lois Lane, he captures her. Superman stops his first rampage through Metropolis by throwing him across a time barrier and into the prehistoric past. A year later, Superman accidentally transports Titano back to modern Metropolis, and has to trick him to return him to the past.

Over the next few years, Titano is visited in the past by several characters, including Superman,Krypto the Superdog,Bizarro and Jimmy Olsen.

After another trip through time into the present day, Titano is picked up by Allura, space ruler in a world of giants, who agrees for transporting him to her home planet. Titano settles down with a female ape in his own size.

Writer Martin Pasko revived Titano in Superman #324 (June 1978). In this revival, Titano is manipulated by the Atomic Skull into becoming a ferocious killer, rather than being an original, but misunderstood super-ape.

The Pre-Crisis Titano appears in a dream of the character Ambush Bug.

Post-Crisis
The Post-Crisis version first appeared in the "Tears for Titano" story in Superman (vol. 2) Annual #1. Titano was originally a normal baby chimpanzee used in cruel scientific experiments for the US government. This lab is headed by Dr. Thomas Moyers, an irresponsible man who caused the creation of Rampage, the super-strong alter-ego of Dr. Kitty Faulkner, also in the employ is Amanda Waller operating under the orders of Sarge Steel. The chimpanzee gains his name from a mean-spirited joke by the other staffers.

A brief visit by Lois Lane to the government laboratories ended soon after Titano tried to escape his tormentors by leaping into Lane's arms. An accident caused the ape to gain super-strength and grow to enormous proportions. Attempting to kill Moyers, whom he saw as his tormentor, Titano was stopped by and engaged in a battle with Superman. The presence of Lane causes Titano to calm down, as he considered her a friend. Moyers used his equipment to reverse the transformation. The reversal is too much for the chimpanzee, who dies in Lane's arms. She later writes the Daily Planet article "Tears for Titano" in honor of the animal.

Another version of Titano appeared as the mascot of "Titano's Pizza". Television advertisements showed a giant ape in a chef's hat defeating "Turtle Boy", who represented the slower delivery of other pizzerias. However, Turtle Boy (played by Jimmy Olsen) proved to be much more popular than Titano, and the commercials were discontinued.
 
In Action Comics #854, a monkey experimented upon by the Kryptonite Man was imbued with Kryptonite radiation, gaining the ability to grow in size and fire Kryptonite beams from his eyes, like the Pre-Crisis Titano. He was eventually calmed down by "Mr. Action" (Jimmy Olsen) and placed in the care of S.T.A.R. Labs.

Titano's Pre-Crisis version would make a reappearance of sorts in Superman/Batman #28, as a guise for a shape-shifting telepathic alien entity.

The New 52
In September 2011, The New 52 rebooted DC's continuity. In this new timeline, Titano was redesigned and given a new origin. Titano was now only slightly bigger than a regular gorilla rather than the giant of earlier versions, and was now an albino. He also was given a new origin in which he was a genetic mutation created by a deranged biophysicist. He was later shown on life support in a Metropolis laboratory and is executed by a creature appearing to be Superman.

Titano was again redesigned by the creative team of Geoff Johns and John Romita Jr. This version was a giant chimpanzee robot with green-glowing inside parts, alluding to a Kryptonite origin.

Powers and abilities
A fusion between two meteors (green kryptonite and uranium) have caused Toto to grow in colossal proportions. As Titano, his size and strength are many times greater than a normal human being. He is able to project Kryptonite beams from his eyes, capable of weakening Superman. But, they cannot penetrate through lead. He develops a special friendship with Lois.

The Post-Crisis version of Titano has similar powers, but he does not possess Kryptonite eyebeams.

Other versions

Bizarro-Titano

On Bizarro World, there is a Bizarro version of Titano who shoots blue kryptonite beams instead of green. In need of a suitable opponent for Bizarro-Lois Lane after she defeated Bizarro-Lana Lang, Bizarro created Bizarro-Titano through the imperfect duplicator ray and the time scope on Titano. Bizarro-Titano entered the wrestling ring with Bizarro-Lois Lane. He wins the fight by leaving the ring to go eat some coconuts that he saw earlier.

JLA: Earth 2
An antimatter version of Titano, appeared near the end of Grant Morrison's JLA: Earth 2. This version is actually a genetic experiment conducted by Brainiac and Ultraman (Subject 773, "Ultra-Titanus") freed by Brainiac and fires Anti-Kryptonite beams at Superman. Being an opposite version of Titano, the beams make him stronger. He is later caught by the Green Lantern.

DC One Million
In DC Comics' DC One Million setting, Titano One Million is the Superman-like defender of the Gorilla Galaxy, a direct descendant of Solovar.

Dark Nights: Metal
In the Dark Nights: Metal series, Titano is the Superman-analogue of Earth-53, a newly revealed DC Multiverse world analogous to the Gorilla Galaxy, along with a lemur Atom, Atlantean Sea Ape and Batape.

In other media

Television
 A 1967 episode "The Chimp Who Made it Big" of The New Adventures of Superman was another version of the Titano story. This was done at the instigation of Superman editor Mort Weisinger, who served as story consultant for the animated series. A collision of a Kryptonite meteor and a uranium asteroid crash near the capsule Toto was in causes it to lose control. Superman saves the capsule and brings it down to Earth. When Lois Lane reports at the rocket base, Toto bursts from the capsule and transforms into Titano. He grabs Lois Lane and Superman tries to stop him but is hit by the giant ape's Kryptonite eye beams. When the military fires missiles at Titano, Superman protects him from the attack. Titano then escapes with Lois Lane while Superman pursues them. He makes a shield of lead and then knocks out Titano. A headline in the Daily Planet newspaper states that the Kryptonite's effects on Titano wore off and he was restored to his normal size. A clip from this episode was broadcast in the first test episode of Sesame Street.
 Although not appearing in the 1988 animated series Superman, a large ape (presumably Titano) is seen in the opening credits scaling the side of the Daily Planet, in front of Clark Kent, Perry White, Jimmy Olsen, and Lois Lane, before Clark changes into Superman and pulls him off the building.
 A different version of Titano, conceptually very similar to the original Titano from the Silver Age, appeared in the Superman: The Animated Series episode "Monkey Fun", with his vocal effects done by Frank Welker. This Titano was a chimpanzee astronaut that was kept in the home of Lt. Colonel Sam Lane, and formed a bond with Lane's 8-year-old daughter Lois. Titano's ship, the Titan 0, from which he got his name, was lost in space and eventually found twenty years later in a meteor shower by Superman. Gases contained inside the meteor have made him grow to enormous proportions. The now-gigantic Titano wreaked havoc on Metropolis. Sam Lane, now a flag officer, rushes to Metropolis to aid Lois by giving her the one thing that could calm Titano: a toy monkey named Beppo that played Pop Goes the Weasel when squeezed. S.T.A.R. Labs is able to put an end to Titano's growth spurts, and he was subsequently relocated Titano to a remote island so he could live a normal life, leaving Beppo for him as his memento of Lois.
 Young Justice has a slight nod to the character in "Performance", where a poster at Haly's Circus advertises an elephant named Titano.
 Titano appears in Justice League Action. In the episode "Harley Goes Ape", he was tended to by Dr. Harleen Quinzel before she worked at Arkham Asylum. Titano's history of being launched into outer space and coming in contact with a Kryptonite meteor is still intact. Placing a special helmet on Titano, Gorilla Grodd takes control of Titano and fights Superman in Metropolis. When Harley Quinn recognizes Titano, she helps Stargirl free Titano who then throws Gorilla Grodd into the direction of a police van. Titano then grabs Harley Quinn and climbs the Daily Planet until Stargirl calms Titano down.
A holographic program in Superman's Fortress of Solitude of Titano appeared in the Superman & Lois episode Closer.

Miscellaneous
 Titano made a cameo appearance in the comic book series based on Superman: The Animated Series. He nearly returned to Metropolis after an environmental terrorist group released him considering his relocation animal rights abuse. Titano was subdued and returned home before he made it to Metropolis.
 Titano is possibly alluded to in the XTC song "That's Really Super, Supergirl" off of their album Skylarking.

Homages
Characters based on Titano have occasionally appeared in comics homaging the Silver Age Superman:
 In Alan Moore's Supreme, the Titano equivalent is Stupendo, the Simian Supreme. Stupendo has a similar origin to the Silver Age Titano (except with Supremium radiation), but was subsequently befriended by Supreme, and given a home on Conqueror Island.

See also
 List of Superman enemies
 List of fictional primates
 Apes in comics

References

Characters created by Curt Swan
Characters created by Otto Binder
Comics characters introduced in 1959
Fictional apes
Fictional characters with nuclear or radiation abilities
Fictional characters with superhuman durability or invulnerability
Fictional chimpanzees
Fictional giants
Gorilla characters in comics
DC Comics characters with superhuman strength
DC Comics supervillains
Superman characters

de:Schurken im Superman-Universum#Titano